A mansion is a very large and imposing house. 

Mansion may also refer to:

Music
Mansions (band), an American indie-rock band
Mansionz, an American alternative hip hop duo
Mansion (album), by NF, or the title song, 2015
Mansions (EP), by Mansions, 2008
"Mansion", a song by Calvin Harris from 18 Months, 2012

Other uses
Mansion block, British English term for an apartment; called Manshon in modern Japanese English

See also
Mansion House (disambiguation)
The Mansion (disambiguation)